The Assembly of Catholic Bishops of Ontario (ACBO) (Assemblée des évêques catholiques de l'Ontario in French) is the association of Catholic bishops in the Province of Ontario. It is involved in providing information about the moral positions of the Catholic Church in all aspects of public life. It works alongside the Canadian Conference of Catholic Bishops on a regional level, while other bishops' assemblies do similar work in other parts of Canada.

Members 
The Assembly of Catholic Bishops of Ontario includes the bishops of 12 dioceses and 4 eparchies as well as the bishop of the Military Ordinariate of Canada, who is a member of all four regional episcopal assemblies in Canada. In 2021 its president is Ronald Peter Fabbro, bishop of London.

The ACBO includes the bishops of the following Catholic jurisdictions:
 Diocese of Hamilton
 Diocese of Hearst–Moosonee
 Archdiocese of Kingston
 Diocese of London
 Archdiocese of Ottawa–Cornwall
 Diocese of Pembroke
 Diocese of Sault Ste Marie
 Diocese of Peterborough
 Diocese of Saint Catharines
 Diocese of Thunder Bay
 Diocese of Timmins
 Archdiocese of Toronto
 Chaldean Catholic Eparchy of Mar Addai of Toronto
 Slovak Catholic Eparchy of Saints Cyril and Methodius of Toronto
 Syro-Malabar Catholic Eparchy of Mississauga
 Ukrainian Catholic Eparchy of Toronto
 Military Ordinariate of Canada

References

External links
Official website
Canadian Conference of Catholic Bishops

Catholic Church in Ontario